Saidabad-e Olya or Saidabad-e Bala (Persian: سعيدابادبالا), both meaning "Upper Saidabad", may refer to:
 Saidabad-e Olya, Kerman
 Saidabad-e Olya, Zanjan